The POINT Community Development Corporation is a non-profit community development corporation dedicated to youth development, culture, and the economic revitalization of the Hunts Point neighborhood of the South Bronx, from which it takes its name. The mission of The POINT CDC is to encourage the arts, local enterprise, responsible ecology, and self-investment in the Hunts Point community. The organization was founded in 1993 by Steven Sapp, Maria Torres, Paul Lipson, and Mildred Ruiz-Sapp.

The POINT CDC is located in a former bagel factory and provides performance art space, visual art galleries, after-school programs, summer camps, circus classes, and community improvement programs.

During Majora Carter's time as a staff member, The POINT CDC was instrumental in the creation of Hunts Point Riverside Park.

The Corporation partners with other organizations such as

 The Bronx borough based ticket distributions for the New York Shakespeare Festival.
 Cirque du Soleil's outreach arm - Cirque du Monde, to provide performances and circus related workshops.
 New York City Parks Department - Creation of Concrete Plant Park transfer of South Brother Island to the New York City Parks Department, and the creation of the South Bronx Greenway.
 Bronx River Alliance - various initiatives supporting the Bronx River Greenway including the creation of pedestrian and bike bridges between Starlight Park and Concrete Plant Park.

The POINT CDC's motto is defined as its "theory of change": "People in the community create the community in which they want to live."

Awards and honors
The POINT CDC has received the following awards and grants:

 1999 OBIE Award Grant
 1999 Bessie Awards Special Achievement/Citations

See also
 Universes (theatre ensemble) - founded by two founders of The POINT CDC
 
 Martine Fougeron - presented photography of the South Bronx Trades at the POINT CDC.
 South Brother Island - The POINT CDC was involved in the transfer of the South Brother Island to the New York City Parks Department in 2007.

References

External links
 The POINT CDC official website

Neighborhood associations
Hunts Point, Bronx
1993 establishments in New York City
Arts organizations established in 1993
Culture of the Bronx
Youth organizations based in New York City
Non-profit organizations based in the Bronx